Robert George May is an American retired accountant and academic administrator.

May earned his bachelor's and doctoral degrees from Michigan State University and began teaching at the University of Texas at Austin in 1979. He was named interim dean of the University of Texas College of Business Administration in 1995, and formally appointed to the post in 1996. He stepped down as dean in 2002, and remained on the faculty until his retirement from teaching in 2013. Over the course of his career at UTAustin, May held an endowed professorship in accounting, which changed its name from the KPMG Professorship, to the KPMG Peat Marwick Professorship, and by his retirement, had become known as the KPMG Centennial Professorship.

Selected publications

References

American accountants
McCombs School of Business faculty
Year of birth missing (living people)
Michigan State University alumni
Business school deans
American university and college faculty deans
Living people
20th-century American male writers
20th-century American non-fiction writers
American male non-fiction writers
Accounting academics